BCycle is a public bicycle sharing company owned by Trek Bicycle and is based in Waterloo, Wisconsin, United States. It has 47 local systems operating in cities across the United States.  However, in several cities it operates under a name other than BCycle (i.e., CAT Bike, Red Bike, GREENbike, etc.)

Description 
The BCycle system consists of bicycles and solar-powered stations positioned throughout a city or region. The result is a slight variation in the system, depending on the city of operation. Such variations can include differences in pricing and operating under a name other than BCycle. Notwithstanding, even though they may operate under different names, their stations will still include the logo with a circled "B" (but perhaps with a different color outer circle). Variations are also affected by the primary sponsors of the local system. 

Users of the system can purchase annual memberships or just a day or week pass. The system is intended for short trips rather than using an automobile or bike rentals. They can then check out and return bikes at any station in their city. Depending on the local system and type of membership or pass, users can keep the bicycles for 30–60 minutes without any additional charge for an unlimited number of times. Bicycles can be used longer for a nominal hourly assessment. However, if a bicycle is returned to any station, it can usually be immediately checked back out for an additional 30-60 free minutes. Another variation is dates and hours of operations. Some systems do not operate at night and some do not operate during the winter months. Notwithstanding the variations, annual memberships are recognized in most BCycle cities in a reciprocity program called "B-connected." The cost of annual memberships vary from US$50 to US$80.

The bicycles used by BCycle were designed specifically for bike sharing by Trek Bicycle.

History 
In 2007, the founding partners of BCycle, Trek and health care insurance company Humana, launched their bike sharing venture with the nation's largest ever temporary bike sharing program at the 2008 Democratic National Convention in Denver, Colorado. Called Freewheelin, this program made 1,000 bikes available to the delegates at both the Democratic and Republican National Conventions. The programs proved so successful that the Democratic host committee selected bike sharing as a special legacy program to receive a donation to launch the country's first smart bike sharing system.

Following the Democratic National Convention, Trek, Humana and advertising agency Crispin Porter + Bogusky formed B-Cycle, LLC to develop a technologically and visually appealing bike share system. The joint venture worked with a non-profit created to operate the system, Denver Bike Sharing, operating as Denver B-cycle, to launch with 500 bikes and 40 stations in Denver on Earth Day, April 22, 2010. In 2018, the eighth year of Denver B-cycle, it received a  subsidy from the City of Denver government.

Controversy and competition

Denver, Colorado 
In 2018, controversy emerged on the Denver City Council, with criticism that "B-cycle is mainly in areas where it's white and wealthy and not in neighborhoods of color and working-class neighborhoods where transit is a need." Substantial competition to dockable bicycle transportation has emerged from unsubsidized "[d]ockless bike and scooter companies have flocked to Denver," including Jump bicycles and Lime scooters.

In mid-November 2019, the city announced the end of the B-cycle operation, with 700 bikes and all stations to be removed by the end of January 2020.

Locations 

As of April 2015, B-cycle has bicycle sharing systems in the following areas:

United States 
 Ann Arbor, Michigan
 Aventura, Florida
 Austin, Texas
 Battle Creek, Michigan
 Boulder, Colorado
 Broward County, Florida
 Charlotte, North Carolina
 Cincinnati, Ohio (Operates under the name Red Bike)
 Clarksville, Tennessee
 Colorado Springs, Colorado (Operates under the name PikeRide)
 Columbia County, Georgia
 Columbus, Indiana
 Dayton, Ohio (Operates under the name Link Dayton Bikeshare)
 Denver, Colorado - discontinued end of Jan. 2020
 Des Moines, Iowa
 El Paso, Texas
 Fargo, North Dakota (Operates under the name Great Rides Bikeshare)
 Fort Worth, Texas (Operates under the name Fort Worth Bike Sharing)
 Greenville, South Carolina
 Houston, Texas
 Indianapolis, Indiana (Operates under the name Indiana Pacers Bikeshare)
 Jackson Hole, Wyoming (Operates under the name START Bike)
 Kansas City, Missouri
 Lakewood, Colorado (DFC, private campus)
 Las Vegas, Nevada (Operates under the name RTC Bike Share)
 Lincoln, Nebraska (Operates under the name BikeLNK)
 Los Angeles, California (Operates under the name Metro Bike Share)
 Madison, Wisconsin
 McAllen, Texas
 Memphis, Tennessee (Operates under the name Explore Bike Share)
 Milwaukee, Wisconsin (Operates under the name Bublr Bikes)
 Nashville, Tennessee
 Oklahoma City, Oklahoma (Operates under the name Spokies)
 Omaha, Nebraska
 Philadelphia, Pennsylvania (Operates under the name Indego)
 Rapid City, South Dakota
 Roseburg, Oregon (VA, private campus)
 Salt Lake City, Utah (Operates under the name GREENbike)
 San Antonio, Texas (Operates under the name SWell Cycle)
 Savannah, Georgia (Operates under the name CAT Bike)
 South San Francisco, California (Genentech)  (Operates under the name gRide)
 Spartanburg, South Carolina
 Tulsa, Oklahoma (Operates under the name This Machine)

See also
 Bicycle sharing system
 Utility cycling - Short-term hire schemes
 Motivate (New York / Boston / Washington DC / San Francisco / Chicago / Toronto / Seattle / Melbourne)
 Vélo'v (Lyon, France)
 Vélib’ (Paris, France)
 Bicing (Barcelona, Spain)
 Santander Cycles (London's BIXI-based system)
 PBSC Urban Solutions
 Zagster

References

External links

 B-cycle (official website)

Bicycle sharing companies